Richard Gibson (born 1 January 1954) is an English actor, best known for his role as the archetypal Gestapo Officer Herr Otto Flick in the BBC hit sitcom series, 'Allo 'Allo!.

Career
Gibson was born in Kampala, Uganda, before the country gained independence from the UK. He was a chorister at St Paul's Cathedral and educated at St Paul's Cathedral School, Radley College near Abingdon, Oxfordshire, and the Central School of Speech and Drama.

He took part in 'Allo 'Allo! during the vast majority of the series. Dressed in an ankle-length leather coat and with the obligatory stiff-legged limp and walking stick, Herr Flick spent his life suppressing peasants, seducing Helga, the German town Commandant's assistant, and vainly trying to get his hands on the original of the painting The Fallen Madonna with the Big Boobies by Van Klomp.

Gibson then toured with the group when Allo 'Allo! transferred to the stage and had successful tours both in the United Kingdom and abroad. The stage version of the show gave rein to his other skills, and he was able to demonstrate his mastery of the violin.

He played Sunning in the 1971 BBC1 television series Tom Brown's Schooldays. His first film role of note was in the 1971 film The Go Between, in which he played Marcus Maudsley, school friend of Leo Colston (Dominic Guard) who passed messages between Julie Christie and Alan Bates, and he also played young Tony Farrant in the 1973 film version of England Made Me. He has also played a wide variety of roles on stage and the TV screen, and in 2006 was a regular guest on The Daily Telegraph's World Cup Pubcast, where he usually took the role of Herr Flick, providing a more biased view of the proceedings. In 2003, he guest starred in the Doctor Who audio drama Flip-Flop.

He has divided his time between Ireland and the UK, and continues to work in films, television, and theatre as well as working as a sub-editor for newspaper publications.

Owing to the enduring popularity of Allo! 'Allo!, he and Kim Hartman have formed a Flick and Helga fan club and made numerous cabaret appearances, using songs and sketches in character. In 2012, as guest speakers on the Fred Olsen ships, Boudicca and Balmoral, they travelled to the Canary Islands and up the Amazon River. In 2014, they were also guest performers at the Malfest Arts Festival in Malpas, Cheshire, and appeared at the War and Peace Show at the Hop Farm in Kent. In 2014 Gibson appeared with fellow Allo, 'Allo! cast members at the Sofia International Film Festival. Gibson also works as a radio actor, scriptwriter and voiceover artist.

He has claimed that, while a chorister, he sang at the funeral service of Sir Winston Churchill in 1965, and was paid £2 10s for his work on the day.

References

External links
 
Interview at Den of Geek

1954 births
20th-century English male actors
21st-century English male actors
Alumni of the Royal Central School of Speech and Drama
British male comedy actors
English male film actors
English male television actors
Living people
People educated at Radley College
People educated at St. Paul's Cathedral School
People from Kampala